Liam Carroll may refer to:

Liam Carroll (businessman), Irish real estate developer
Liam Carroll (hurler), Irish hurler
Liam Carroll (judoka) (born 1946), Irish judoka